Persab (stands for Persatuan Sepakbola Belu) is a Indonesian football club based in Haliwen Stadium, Belu Regency, East Nusa Tenggara. This team competes in Liga 3 East Nusa Tenggara Zone.

Supporters
The Persab Belu supporter is Belu Mania whose base is mostly in Belu Regency.

References

External links

Belu Regency
Football clubs in Indonesia
Football clubs in East Nusa Tenggara
1958 establishments in Indonesia
Association football clubs established in 1958